Saluag Island is located in the Province of Tawi-Tawi, in the Autonomous Region in Muslim Mindanao, Philippines. 

Its length is 1.6 kilometres. The island belongs administratively to the municipality of Sibutu and is the southernmost island of the Philippines.

References 

Islands of Tawi-Tawi